The Lancashire Football Association Challenge Trophy is an English football competition for senior non-league clubs who are members of the Lancashire County Football Association. The trophy was first played for in 1885, when it was known as the Lancashire Junior Cup. It is currently sponsored by Partners Foundation and is known as The Partners Foundation Challenge Trophy. Although officially the junior cup to the Lancashire Senior Cup it is still regarded as just as important as other county cup competitions.

Format
The competition is open to senior non-league clubs within the historical boundaries of Lancashire. A total of 28 clubs currently enter the competition from six different leagues. As of 2008–09 the four clubs from the Football Conference each receive byes to the second round, where they are then joined by the twelve winners from the first round.

From the 2009–10 season the semi-finals have been played at the County Ground, Thurston Road in Leyland, with the final being held at the Reebok Stadium, home of Bolton Wanderers. The 2011–12 final between Chorley FC and Kendal Town FC, played on 12 March 2012, attracted a crowd of 2,673.

History
The first Lancashire FA Challenge Trophy took place in the 1885–86 season, when Bells Temperance were the winners. The only times the trophy was not competed was 1915–18 during World War I, 1940–41 season during World War II, although it did continue for the rest of the war years, and 2020-21 due to the COVID-19 pandemic. Chorley are the most successful club with eighteen wins, the first coming in 1893–94 and the last of which came in 2017–18. Former non-league clubs Morecambe, who now play in the Football League and Wigan Athletic, now in League One are next with eleven wins. Morecambe's last victory coming in 2003–04 and Wigan's was in 1977–78.

Past winners
A full list of past winners -

Winners by club

References

External links
Official website of the Lancashire County Football Association

Football in Lancashire
County Cup competitions
Recurring events established in 1885